Cari Cari is an Austrian indie rock duo formed by drummer and singer Stephanie Widmer and guitarist/singer Alexander Köck. They claim to have founded the band to get their music in a Quentin Tarantino film.

The duo released their debut EP AMERIPPINDUNKLER in 2014 followed by a tour through Australia including shows in Darwin, Cairns and Melbourne. The songs "No War" and "White Line Fever" were featured in the US TV-series Shameless and The Magicians.

In 2017/2018 the duo was awarded the XA - Austrian Music Export Award and performed at festivals such as Primavera Sound Barcelona, Eurosonic Noorderslag, Free Tree Festival and Sonograph in Austria, and The Great Escape Festival in the UK. In 2022, Cari Cari won the radio FM4 Award at the Amadeus Austrian Music Awards.

During the celebrations of the centenary of Cari Cari's native Burgenland, Alexander Köck, during his own performance, publicly criticized the low fees of the student orchestra musicians performing there.

Discography 
 2014: AMERIPPINDUNKLER (EP, Bohemian Vienna)
 2017: Nothing's Older Than Yesterday (Single, Ink Music)
 2018: Mapache (Single), Summer Sun (Single)
 2018: Anaana (Album)
 2021: Jelly Jelly (Single), Belo Horizonte (Single)
 2022: Welcome to Kookoo Island (EP)

References

External links 

 Official Website
 Discogs

Austrian indie rock groups